Les Toth is a Melbourne-based actor and DJ who has had several film and television roles.  He has also been one of the city's best known DJs for several decades.

Some of Les' television and film credits include Garbo, The Castle, Janus, Stingers, and Neighbours.  Les was a radio announcer on City FM between 1999–2001.

References

External links 
 Les Toth Myspace page
 Les Toth Filmography

Male actors from Melbourne
Australian male film actors
Australian male television actors
Radio personalities from Melbourne
Living people
Year of birth missing (living people)